is a Japanese actor. He is most famous for playing villains and appeared in many jidaigeki and detective television dramas as a guest. He is also known as voice actor. Taguchi graduated from University of Tokyo.His career as a screen actor started in 1955. His first film appearance was in the 1955 film Aisureba Koso directed by Satsuo Yamamoto.

His son Kazuki Iwata is also actor.

Filmography

Films
 An Actress (1956)
 Lucky Dragon No. 5 (film) (1959)
 Akitsu Springs (1962)
 King Kong Escapes (1967)
 Soshiki Bōryoku Kyodaijingi (1969)
 Tokyo Blackout (1987)

Television drama
 Akō Rōshi (1964)
 Hissatsu Shiokinin (1972) episode 18 Guest starring
The Water Margin (1973),
 Mito Kōmon (1973~2011) 29 appearances as a Guest
 Taiyō ni Hoero! (1973~1984) episode 108,279,357,592 Guest starring
 G-Men '75 (1978–81) episode 137,179,275,315,341 Guest starring
 Hissatsu Shiokiya Kagyō (1975) episode 8 Guest starring
  Shin Hissatsu Shiokinin  (1977) episode 11  Guest starring
 Hissatsu Karakurinin Fugakuhiyakkei Koroshitabi (1978)) episode 12 Guest starring
 Abarenbō Shōgun (1978–2000)  32 appearances as a Guest

variety and liberal arts programs 
Heisei Board of Education
In the afternoon, ○○ Oikkiri TV (NTV) ※Guest Commentator

Dubbing
 Super Jetter,Jaugar
 Nixon, Richard Nixon (Anthony Hopkins)

References

External links

Japanese male film actors
Actors from Nagano Prefecture
20th-century Japanese male actors
Living people
1933 births